Cedariver, formerly known as The Baker Reservation, is a  open space preserve located on the Charles River in Millis, Massachusetts.

Cedariver is open to hiking, picnicking, car-top boating, cross country skiing, and other passive pursuits. A trailhead is located on Forest Road in Millis. The property was a 2004 gift of the family of Polly Baker.

References

External links
Cedariver The Trustees of Reservations
Trail map

Protected areas of Norfolk County, Massachusetts
The Trustees of Reservations
Open space reserves of Massachusetts
Protected areas established in 2004
2004 establishments in Massachusetts